Radisson Blu Plaza Hotel, Oslo, formerly Radisson SAS Plaza Hotel, Oslo, known locally as Oslo Plaza, is situated in Oslo city centre.

The building was designed by the architectural firm White.se and completed in 1989. The hotel was officially opened on March 14, 1990, by King Olav V of Norway.  In 1992, a footbridge was built between the hotel and the Oslo Spektrum arena. The hotel was remodeled in 2012.

The hotel has 37 floors and 678 rooms. There are a total of 1,500 beds, 140 business rooms and 20 suites. The tower's foundations are concrete, and it has reflective glass facades. The uppermost floors are tapered with a steep diagonal roof on one side, leading to a sharp ridge. It also has an external glass elevator, which travels up to the bar/restaurant at the top. A lower block, three floors tall, contains the entrance, a lobby, restaurants and conference rooms.

On the thirty-third and thirty-fourth floors (the top of the building), there is a swimming pool and a sauna.

Jennifer Fairgate 

The Oslo Plaza hotel is known for the mysterious death of an unidentified woman in 1995. On June 3, 1995, the body of a woman was found inside room 2805. She checked into the hotel with the false name of "Jennifer Fairgate", but she misspelled the last name as "Fergate" twice on hotel paperwork. On these forms, it appeared that a man by the name of Lois Fairgate checked in with her. Unfortunately, it's unclear of his involvement, identity, or location at the time of her death or during her stay. She provided a fake address for a small village in Belgium (the village of Verlaine). Her death was ruled a suicide with a Browning 9mm pistol found in her hand. However, the lack of gunshot residue and blood on her hand raised questions about the cause of death. No identification was found in the hotel room and the pistol's serial number was scratched off. Many theories suggest that Fairgate was a covert operative and she was involved with some sort of intelligence agency. Removing tags from clothing, removing serial numbers from weapons, and a false identity are all common practices of intelligence agents.

She had extensive dental work done that was done in gold and porcelain indicating a wealthy background. Her belongings contained expensive clothes with all but one of the brand tags removed. She also only packed clothing for her upper body, and no pants or skirts were found among her belongings. 

She was last seen alive the previous day when she ordered room service at 8:06 PM. Kristin Andersen delivered the food to the woman and noticed the room she was staying in was "almost sterile". She gave her a tip of 50-kroner (US$5.51) before Andersen left. This meal is significant because the autopsy found undigested food in her stomach, suggesting she died the day she ordered the meal, not the day after like investigators originally thought.

In November 2016, her body was exhumed to try to collect a DNA profile. In June 2017, a DNA profile was successfully extracted from her body.

The unusual circumstances of her death were covered on the second volume of Season 1 of Netflix's Unsolved Mysteries, which premiered in October 2020.

See also
Radisson Blu Scandinavia Hotel, Oslo
Isdal Woman, comparable case in Norway 1970

References

External links 

Hotels in Oslo
Radisson Blu
Hotel buildings completed in 1989
Hotels established in 1990
Modernist architecture in Norway
1989 establishments in Norway
Skyscraper hotels
Rezidor Hotel Group